Nigel A. Philip Godfrey (born 25 April 1951) is an Anglican priest: he has been the Dean of Peel since 2011.

He was ordained after a period of study at Ripon College Cuddesdon in 1980.  He was Curate at St John the Divine, Kennington from 1979 to 1989; and then Vicar at Christ Church, Brixton until 2001. He was the Principal  Ordained  Minister Training for the Diocese of Southwark from 2001 until 2007 when he became the Vicar and Vice Dean of St German's Cathedral.

References

1915 births
Manx people
People educated at King William's College
Alumni of Ripon College Cuddesdon
Deans of Peel
1983 deaths